Ismagilovo (İsmäğil) is a rural locality (a selo) and the administrative centre of Ismagilovsky Selsoviet, Aurgazinsky District, Bashkortostan, Russia. The population was 918 as of 2010. There are 8 streets.

Geography 
Ismagilovo is located 23 km north of Tolbazy (the district's administrative centre) by road. Ishly is the nearest rural locality.

References 

Rural localities in Aurgazinsky District